Roy L. Prosterman (born July 13, 1935) is Professor Emeritus of Law at the University of Washington and the founder of the Rural Development Institute (RDI), which changed its name to Landesa in January 2011. He is also active in the fields of land reform, rural development, and foreign aid. He has provided advice and conducted research in more than 40 countries in Asia, the former Soviet Union, Europe, the Middle East, and Latin America. Prosterman has received many awards and distinctions, the 2003 Gleitsman International Activist Award, a Schwab Foundation Outstanding Global Social Entrepreneur and more recently, the inaugural 2006 Henry R. Kravis Prize in Nonprofit Leadership where he was lauded as "Champion for the World's Poor". He has also been nominated for The World Food Prize, Conrad N. Hilton Humanitarian Prize, and Alcan Prize for Sustainability. Prosterman is a frequent guest speaker and presenter at world forums on poverty alleviation and is a frequent published author in nonfiction and fiction.

Prosterman received his law degree from Harvard Law School.

Founding of Landesa Rural Development Institute

In the 1960s, Prosterman was working as an associate attorney on Wall Street at Sullivan & Cromwell (where he stayed for six years before taking a job to teach in 1965), but was troubled by the escalating Vietnam War as thousands of impoverished rural farmers desperate to feed their families joined the Viet Cong.

Prosterman realized that giving poor farmers land rights to the land they were farming would transform the lives of these families, the country, and ultimately the world. It was just an idea. Before he knew it, Prosterman was standing in a rice paddy in the midst of the Vietnam War testing his idea through legislation—the Land to the Tiller program. That legislation gave land rights to one million tenant farmers, allowed them to feed their families, cut Viet Cong recruitment by 80%, and increased rice production in the country by 30%.

It was also the birth of the Rural Development Institute (RDI), now called Landesa, an international nonprofit organization working to secure land rights for the world's poorest.

Today, 50 years after Prosterman stood in the rice paddies of South Vietnam, Landesa has worked in 50 countries throughout the world to secure land rights for more than 400,000,000 people.

Prosterman, now Chair Emeritus of Landesa, has helped Landesa grow into a global organization with field offices in China, India, Myanmar, and Tanzania. Landesa is now sought after by foreign governments, foreign aid agencies, and NGOs alike for its insight and expertise on land issues.

Awards
 2010 University of Chicago Public Service Award 
 2003 Gleitsman Foundation International Activist Award 
 2002 Recognized as top Social entrepreneur by Schwab Foundation for Social Entrepreneurship

References

External links 
 Landesa
 "Secure Land Rights as a Foundation for Broad-Based Rural Development in China: Results and Recommendations from a Seventeen-Province Survey," by Roy Prosterman et al (NBR Special Report, November 2009)

Living people
Harvard Law School alumni
University of Washington faculty
American legal scholars
American anti-poverty advocates
Sullivan & Cromwell associates
1935 births